T-Bird Rhythm is the fourth studio album by Texas-based blues rock band The Fabulous Thunderbirds, released in 1982. The recording contains a mixture of covers and originals. Chrysalis dropped the band following the release of the album.

Production
The album was produced by Nick Lowe. A video was produced for "How Do You Spell Love?"

Critical reception
Robert Christgau wrote that "both sides open with fetchingly offhand ravers, Kim Wilson works his shoo-fly drawl for gumbo lilt, and the mysterious J. Miller contributes the irresistible 'You're Humbuggin' Me', which had me tearing through my Jimmy Reed records in a fruitless search for the original." The Globe and Mail wrote: "Jimmy Vaughan's guitar can make the hairs on the back of your neck stand on end, but the real genius of this band is vocalist and harmonica player Kim Wilson." The New York Times called T-Bird Rhythm "a rocking album that generates excitement without sounding like the work of fanatic blues revivalists," writing: "[It] should win this soulful and accomplished band some pop air play and long-overdue recognition. And it's a welcome change for Nick Lowe, whose productions had recently begun sounding a bit like a formula and washed out."

Track listing 
All tracks composed by Kim Wilson; except where indicated
 "Can't Tear It Up Enuff"
 "How Do You Spell Love?" (Bobby Patterson, Jerry Strickland, Marshall Boxley)
 "You're Humbuggin' Me" (J.D. Miller, Rocket Morgan)
 "My Babe'" (Ron Holden)
 "Neighbor Tend to Your Business" (Huey P Meaux)
 "Monkey" (Dave Bartholomew, Pearl King)
 "Diddy Wah Diddy" (Willie Dixon, Ellas McDaniel)
 "Lover's Crime"
 "Poor Boy"
 "Tell Me" (J.D. Miller)
 "Gotta Have Some/Just Got Some" (Willie Dixon, William Robert Emerson, Don Talty)

Personnel
The Fabulous Thunderbirds
Kim Wilson - vocals, harmonica
Jimmie Vaughan - guitar
Keith Ferguson - bass
Fran Christina - drums, backing vocals
Technical
Colin Fairley - engineer
Larry Williams - photography

References

External links
Official Site

1982 albums
The Fabulous Thunderbirds albums
Albums produced by Nick Lowe
Chrysalis Records albums